Highway 173 (AR 173, Ark. 173, and Hwy. 173) is a north–south state highway in Southeast Arkansas. The route begins at the Overflow National Wildlife Refuge (NWR) and runs north to U.S. Route 165 in Wilmot. The route is maintained by the Arkansas Department of Transportation (ArDOT).

Route description
The area is known for flat, agricultural land with swamps, bayous and small towns dotting the landscape. The highway runs northeast, crossing Bayou Bartholomew before terminating at US 165 along then north edge of Wilmot.

History
The highway was created from a former alignment of Highway 52 at the request of the county judge on July 18, 1985.

Major intersections

See also

References

External links

173
Transportation in Ashley County, Arkansas